Komatireddy Raj Gopal Reddy (born 1 June 1967) is an Indian politician and a former Member of Legislative Assembly of Munugode of Telangana state, ex. Member of Legislative Council and ex. member of the 15th Lok Sabha. He belongs to the Bharatiya Janata Party since August 2022. He was former Member of the Legislative Assembly from the village Munugode and also the former member of Indian National Congress.

Early life
He was born in Brahmana Vellemla village, Narketpally, Nalgonda district to Papi Reddy. He has a bachelor's degree in arts. His elder brother is former minister and former MLA,
now member of 17th Lok Sabha from Bhuvanagiri constituency, Komatireddy Venkat Reddy.

Career
Reddy won from Bhongir constituency in 2009.
Reddy is an entrepreneur turned politician. He actively participated in the Telangana agitation by voicing his opinion in the parliament for the separate statehood of Telangana. He lost to Bura Narsaiah Goud for the Bhongir parliamentary constituency in 2014 Parliament elections. He won as a Member of the Legislative Council for the Local bodies constituency of Nalgonda Dist. He resigned from the post of MLC with 3 years of tenure remaining and won as a Member of the Legislative Assembly from Munugode Assembly constituency in the 2018 Assembly elections. He fought for the issues related to his constituency but all in vain as the ruling party TRS wasn't able to fulfil the demands of their constituents thereby leading him to resign from the post of MLA. He joined  Bhartiya Janata Party(BJP) on August 21 and is currently contesting as a BJP candidate for the Munugode Assembly by-election.

References

Living people
India MPs 2009–2014
People from Telangana
Telangana politicians
Indian National Congress politicians
1967 births
Lok Sabha members from Andhra Pradesh
People from Nalgonda district
Telangana MLAs 2018–2023
Bharatiya Janata Party politicians from Telangana